The United States competed at the 2013 World Aquatics Championships in Barcelona, Spain between July 19 and August 4, 2013.

Medalists

Diving

American divers were eligible for two spots in each individual event (1 m, 3 m, and 10 m) and one team spot for each synchronized event (3 m and 10 m). All in all, fifteen divers (seven men and eight women) were selected to represent The United States at this year's world championships. Notable divers featured reigning Olympic champion David Boudia and bronze medal pair Troy Dumais and Kristian Ipsen.

Men

Women

High diving

Five athletes were selected to represent The United States in high diving at this year's world championships. David Colturi was initially entered but did not compete.

Open water swimming

Eight open water swimmers were qualified based on their performances at the USA Swimming Open Water National Championships. The official roster featured Olympic silver medalist Haley Anderson for the women's events, and 2012 Olympians Andrew Gemmell and Alex Meyer for the men's events.

Men

Women

Mixed

Swimming

U.S. swimmers earned qualifying standards in the following events (up to a maximum of 2 swimmers in each event at the A-standard entry time, and 1 at the B-standard): Swimmers qualified at the 2013 U.S. World Championships Trials in Indianapolis, Indiana.

The U.S. team consisted of 44 swimmers (22 males and females each). Thirty of these swimmers have competed at the 2012 Summer Olympics in London including undisputed superstars Ryan Lochte and Missy Franklin, and notable Olympic champions Dana Vollmer, Matt Grevers, Nathan Adrian, Tyler Clary, and Katie Ledecky.

Men

Women

Synchronized swimming

U.S. synchronized swimmers earned qualifying standards in the following events.

Water polo

Men's tournament

Team roster

Merrill Moses
Janson Wigo
Alexander Obert
Alexander Bowen
Matthew De Trane
Chancellor Ramirez
J. W. Krumpholz
Tony Azevedo
Shea Buckner
Tim Hutten
Michael Rosenthal
John Mann
Andrew Stevens

Group play

Round of 16

Women's tournament

Team roster

Elizabeth Armstrong
Lauren Silver
Melissa Seidemann
Rachel Fattal
Caroline Clark
Maggie Steffens
Courtney Mathewson
Kiley Neushul
Jillian Kraus
Kelly Rulon
Annika Dries
Kami Craig
Tumua Anae

Group play

Round of 16

Quarterfinal

5th–8th place semifinal

Fifth place game

See also
The United States at other World Championships in 2013
 United States at the 2013 UCI Road World Championships
 United States at the 2013 World Championships in Athletics

References

External links
Official website
Barcelona 2013 Official Site

Nations at the 2013 World Aquatics Championships
2013 in American sports
United States at the World Aquatics Championships